HMS Trincomalee is a Royal Navy  sailing frigate built shortly after the end of the Napoleonic Wars. She is now restored as a museum ship afloat in the National Museum of the Royal Navy, Hartlepool, England.

History

1812–1847
Trincomalee is one of two surviving British frigates of her era—her near-sister  (of the modified Leda class) is now a museum ship in Dundee. After being ordered on 30 October 1812, Trincomalee was built in Bombay, India, by the Wadia family of shipwrights in teak, due to oak shortages in Britain as a result of shipbuilding drives for the Napoleonic Wars. The ship was named Trincomalee after the 1782 Battle of Trincomalee off the Ceylon (Sri Lanka) port of that name.

Work on the Trincomalee began in May 1816. Ceremonially an engraved silver nail was hammered into the ship's keel by the master shipbuilder Jamsetjee Bomanjee Wadia, this being considered vital for the ship's well-being, according to Parsi Zoroastrian tradition. With a construction cost of £23,000 (approximately £2,015,000 in 2020), Trincomalee was launched on 12 October 1817. Commander Philip Henry Bridges sailed her to Portsmouth Dockyard, where she arrived on 30 April 1819, with a journey costing £6,600. During the maiden voyage the ship arrived at Saint Helena on 24 January 1819, where she stayed for 6 days, leaving with an additional passenger, a surgeon who had attended Napoleon at Longwood House on the island, Mr John Stokoe.

After being fitted out at a further cost of £2,400, Trincomalee was placed in reserve until 1845, when she was re-armed with fewer guns giving greater firepower, had her stern reshaped and was reclassified as a sixth-rate spar-decked corvette.

1847–1895
Trincomalee departed from Portsmouth in 1847 and remained in service for ten years, serving on the North American and West Indies station. During her time, she was to help quell riots in Haiti and stop a threatened invasion of Cuba, and serve on anti-slavery patrol. In 1849, she was despatched to Newfoundland and Labrador before being recalled to Britain in 1850. In 1852 she sailed to join the Pacific Squadron on the west coast of America, and upon returning to
England in 1857, she was put back 'in ordinary' after arriving at Chatham on 4th September.

In 1860 Trincomalee was fitted out and then in January 1861 towed to Sunderland to become tender to the drill ship , whose role was to train Naval Volunteers boys aged 15 to 16 years being signed up to serve for 10 years on reaching the age of 18 years. During this time Trincomalee'''s gunports were again modified several times to accommodate different types of training armament. Then in 1862 she was moved to West Hartlepool, then the third largest port in Britain, and
moored in the Union Dock to become an independent drill ship.

 TS Foudroyant Trincomalee finished her Royal Navy service as a training ship, but was placed in reserve again in 1895 and sold for scrap two years later on 19 May 1897.

She remained in service until 1986, after which she was again restored and renamed back to Trincomalee in 1992.

Later years

Until his death in 1929, the Falmouth-based painter Henry Scott Tuke used the ship and its trainees as subject matter.

Gallery

See also
 – 18th-century first rate ship of the line
 – 18th-century US Navy frigate
 – a surviving sister ship
Historical Maritime Society

References

Further reading
Andrew Lambert – Trincomalee: the last of Nelson’s frigates'', Chatham Publishing, 2002,

External links

HMS Trincomalee official website

Frigates of the Royal Navy
Museum ships in the United Kingdom
Museums in County Durham
Tall ships of the United Kingdom
1817 ships
Leda-class frigates
Ships and vessels of the National Historic Fleet
British ships built in India